Torodora pinigisanica is a moth in the family Lecithoceridae. It was described by Kyu-Tek Park in 2008. It is found in Palawan in the Philippines.

References

Moths described in 2008
Torodora